State Route 588 (SR 588) is an east–west state highway in the southeastern portion of the U.S. state of Ohio.  The western terminus of SR 588 is at SR 325 in Rio Grande.  Its eastern terminus is at a signalized intersection with SR 7 in downtown Gallipolis.

Route description
SR 588 runs entirely within the central part of Gallia County.  No portion of SR 588 is included as a part of the National Highway System, a system of highways that are considered most important for the economy, mobility and defense of the country.

History
SR 588 was designated in 1947.  It was originally routed along its present alignment between the Jackson Pike (present-day County Road 35) intersection southeast of Rio Grande and its current eastern terminus at SR 7 in Gallipolis.  At that time, the combination of present SR 588 northwest of what was its western terminus at the time and Jackson Pike southeast of that point were a part of US 35.  When the entirety of the US 35 freeway was completed through Gallia County by 1992, SR 588 was extended northwest from its previous western terminus along the former routing of US 35 to its current western terminus at SR 325 in Rio Grande.

Major intersections

References

588
Transportation in Gallia County, Ohio